Osama Tahir is a Pakistani television actor, producer and film actor. He worked and starred in several critically acclaimed television serials such as Dar Si Jaati Hai Sila, Belapur Ki Dayan and Hania, the first one of which earned him Lux Style Award for Best Emerging Talent. Later he appeared in dramas such as Mushk, Neeli Zinda Hai and Baddua.

Early life 
He completed his studies from Institute of Business Management and graduated with a MBA degree. Then he gave an auditioned for a theatre play called Starlight at Pakistan American Cultural Center (PACC) and then he did theatre for ten years.

Career 
Tahir made his acting debut with Umer Adil's directional 2017 film Chalay Thay Saath in which he played the role of a young boy name Zain.

He made his television debut by starring in Kashif Nisar's directionl Dar Si Jaati Hai Sila where he portrayed the character of Raheel opposite Yumna Zaidi for which he received Lux Style Award nomination. He then portrayed a young man in supernatural-horror serial Belapur Ki Dayan, a helpless romantic man in domestic drama Hania and an ambitious and steadfast guy in historical drama Deewar-e-Shab.

In May 2020, he launched his own YouTube channel.

Osama appeared in a lead role in Carma – The Movie, directed by Kashan Admani. He played the characters of Hamza & Haroon in the film.

Filmography

Television series

Film

Awards and nominations

References

External links
 

1990 births
Pakistani male television actors
21st-century Pakistani male actors
Pakistani male models
Living people
Lux Style Award winners
Male actors in Urdu cinema